Edward Robert "Ted" Pocock  (14 March 19345 April 2013) was an Australian public servant and diplomat.

Pocock first joined the Department of External Affairs in 1959. He stayed only a short time, leaving for the United Kingdom to start his doctorate, but returned in 1961.

Pocock married Margaret Elizabeth Grosvenor on 30 January 1971 at a church in Sutton, New South Wales.

In 1980, Pocock was appointed to his first ambassadorial position as Australian Ambassador to the Republic of Korea. Between 1984 and 1987, Pocock was Australian Ambassador to the Soviet Union and Mongolia. In 1987, Pocock was appointed Ambassador to France.

References

1934 births
2013 deaths
Ambassadors of Australia to Belgium
Ambassadors of Australia to France
Ambassadors of Australia to Morocco
Ambassadors of Australia to South Korea
Ambassadors of Australia to the Soviet Union
High Commissioners of Australia to Pakistan
University of Adelaide alumni
Members of the Order of Australia